

Kurt August Viktor Weyher (30 August 1901 – 17 December 1991) was a German rear admiral of the navy (Kriegsmarine) of Nazi Germany. During World War II, he commanded a merchant raider. 

Although it was not mentioned in his book "The Black Raider", it seems that Weyher was a non-trivial painter; in a feature article author Keith Gordon tells that on the voyage of the Orion Weyher did about 30 paintings on subjects connected with the ship's activities. The one painting illustrated seems to have had narrative merit and to have represented the topographic background recognisably.

Awards 
 Silesian Eagle 2nd and 1st Grade
 Iron Cross (1939) 2nd Class (9 July 1940) & 1st Class (30 August 1940)
 Kriegsabzeichen für Hilfskreuzer (23 August 1941)
 Knight's Cross of the Iron Cross on 21 August 1941 as Fregattenkapitän and commander of auxiliary cruiser Orion (HSK-1)
 German Cross in Gold on 18 May 1944 as Kapitän zur See and chief of the Deutsches Marinekommando Konstanza (German naval command Constanța)
 Cross of Merit on ribbon (29 April 1977)

References

Citations

Bibliography

 
 
 
 Weyher, Kurt; "The German navy in the south-eastern area of Europe from the summer of 1941 to the autumn of 1944 ; under the orders of the Southern Naval Command". Publisher: U.S. Navy (1947).
 Weyher, Kurt;  Ehrlich, Hans Jürgen; "The Black Raider". Pub: ELEK Books London (1955) hardback. Also:  Panther Books; Panther edition (1958) paperback.

1901 births
1991 deaths
Counter admirals of the Kriegsmarine
Recipients of the Gold German Cross
Recipients of the Knight's Cross of the Iron Cross
German military personnel of the Spanish Civil War
Recipients of the Cross of the Order of Merit of the Federal Republic of Germany
People from Grudziądz
People from West Prussia
Imperial German Navy personnel of World War I
Reichsmarine personnel